SCOTTeVEST is a clothing company that specializes in creating clothing with multiple pockets and compartments for electronic devices and other personal items. The company was founded in 2000 by Scott Jordan, an entrepreneur and inventor who was frustrated with the lack of functional clothing options for people who needed to carry multiple electronic devices on a regular basis. The company's clothing line includes jackets, pants, and shirts. The company is known for its innovative designs and has been featured in various media outlets, including The New York Times and Forbes magazine.    

Although marketed towards travellers, the company also caters to users in the military and law-enforcement who are required to carry multiple devices.

Origins

As 'Scott eVest' the company was founded by Scott Jordan in 2000 in Chicago, Illinois. 'eVest' references the company's first product, described as "a techie version of the classic fisherman's vest".

In 2002 the brand name was modified to reduce its similarity to IBM's lower-case 'e' following a lawsuit threat. In 2003, the company moved headquarters from Chicago to Ketchum, Idaho. In 2004, after another Idaho company, Scott USA sued the company for violating their company trademark by using the word "Scott," the case was settled by concatenation of Scott eVest into a single word. The company has been known as Scottevest since, recording a steady annual revenue growth from 20 to 40 percent. In December 2013 the company estimated the year's sales at 10 million dollars, 85% of this coming through the website.

Merchandise

Described by Jordan as travel clothing "that doesn't look like travel clothing," Scottevest coats and jackets are deliberately designed to circumnavigate baggage allowance weight and space restrictions by enabling wearers to stash the usual contents of their carry-on bag in up to 42 specially designed pockets. The designs are engineered to distribute the weight of the loaded pockets evenly across the garment, maintaining a slim, non-bulky silhouette. In addition to the jackets and outerwear, more unusual products include boxer shorts with a pocket for a smartphone.

One signature design feature is incorporated channels for threading wires and flexes, inspired by an accident Jordan had after snagging the cable of his headphones on a door-handle while running through an airport. Other designs incorporate flexible, detachable solar panels (made using CIGS on a stainless steel substrate), intended to be used to charge gadgets. Scottevest were the first to offer a wearable battery for recharging Google Glass, incorporated into a shirt.

Media
On March 2, 2012, Jordan represented Scottevest on Episode 30 of the ABC Show, Shark Tank, where he chose not to accept investment offers of up to $1 million. During the Episode, Mark Cuban criticized the company's strategy and Mr. Jordan's approach of patenting a "common sense" move. Per the ABC website "DO THE SHARKS BITE? The Sharks learn that Scott only wants to sell a stake in licensing the patent, not his lucrative retail clothing business. They also learn that Scott has settled with many companies that infringed on his patent. Mark is upset by this news since the patent is for a common sense move. Daymond agrees. He's out. Barbara is also out, but Robert will give the $500k for a 15% stake in the patent and retail clothing business. Scott says that would be insane. Mark is out because he feels upcoming wireless technology will hurt the business. Scott doesn't feel like that's a great loss since he was never going to invest anyway. Kevin will give Scott $1 million for a 30% stake in the patent and retail business if Robert will partner with him, but then matches Robert's offer when that notion goes south." 

Jordan's autobiography, Pocket Man: The Unauthorized Autobiography of a Passionate, Personal Promoter was published on 30 October 2014.

In late January 2018 Jordan posted comments on social media that stated that the company advertised on Fox News because viewers were "gullible" and "idiots." Following negative coverage in the media, the comments and the social media accounts were deleted and an apology issued. The company swiftly distanced itself from their former CEO (who had stepped down in 2017), describing his comments as "impulsive and inappropriate."  However, in March 2019, Jordan resumed his role as CEO of SCOTTeVEST.

References

External links

Clothing companies of the United States
Outdoor clothing brands
Companies based in Idaho
2000 establishments in Illinois
2003 establishments in Idaho